This is a list of finalists for the 2002 Archibald Prize for portraiture (listed is Artist – Title).

Finalists
    Bruce Armstrong – Stuart Purves
 David Bromley – Charles Blackman
    Tom Carment – Richard Neville
 Peter Churcher – Monique
 Adam Cullen – Mark Brandon Read – author
    Julie Dowling – Henry
 Geoffrey Dyer – The last survivor Alec Campbell
 Esther Erlich – Deborah Conway
    Neil Evans – Reflective self-portrait
 David Fairbairn – Dottore Vincenzo Blefari – mascherato Dottore Vincenzo Blefari – smascherato
    Garry Foye – Portrait of Dr. Henry Stenning
 Robert Hannaford – Lynda Syddick Napaltjarri
 Nicholas Harding – Rusty Peters
 Brent Harris – Leo Schofield
 Cherry Hood – Simon Tedeschi unplugged (Winner: Archibald Prize 2002)
    James Hunt – Bora – (Anthony Mundine)
    Lindy Lee – Roslyn Oxley
 Kerrie Lester – Interrupting Mr Smart!
 Mathew Lynn – Anna Volska
 Lewis Miller – Portrait of Stephen Feneley
    Paul Newton – Portrait of Fred Street AM
    Angus Nivison – Annie Lewis, September 2001
    Stephen Nothling – Self portrait thinking about painting a portrait of Eva Breuer to enter into the Archibald Prize
    Carmel O'Connor – Portrait of Professor Bernard Smith
    Mary Pinnock – Martin Sharp
    Paul Ryan – Richard, arms folded
 Jenny Sages – Ros and Joe
    Jiawei Shen – The lady from Shanghai (Jenny Sages)
    Paul Thomas Vrondidis – Painting pears
    Dick Watkins – David Moore
 Jan Williamson – Jenny Morris – singer/songwriter

See also
Previous year: List of Archibald Prize 2001 finalists
Next year: List of Archibald Prize 2003 finalists
List of Archibald Prize winners

External links
Archibald Prize 2002 finalists official website

2002
Archibald Prize 2002
Archibald Prize 2002
Archibald
Arch
Archibald
Archibald